Local elections were held in  Buhi, Camarines Sur on May 13, 2019, within the Philippine general election, for posts of the mayor, vice mayor and eight councilors.

Overview
The incumbent mayor, Margarita Aguinillo of Nationalist People's Coalition ran once again for mayoral post against vice mayor Rey Lacoste from PDP–Laban party.

Results
The candidates for mayor and vice mayor with the highest number of votes win. They are voted for separately. Therefore, they may be of different parties when elected.

Mayoral and vice mayoral elections

Municipal Council elections
Voters elected eight councilors to comprise the Municipal Council or the Sangguniang Bayan. Candidates were voted separately so winning candidates may come from different political parties. The eight candidates with the highest number of votes won the seats.

References

External links
 Official website of the Commission on Elections
  Official website of National Movement for Free Elections (NAMFREL)
 Official website of the Parish Pastoral Council for Responsible Voting (PPCRV)

Camarines Sur